Fumble is the fifth studio album by American hardcore band Scream. It was recorded in December 1989 at Inner Ear Studios in Arlington, Virginia, and released in July 1993 through Dischord. It is notable for showcasing the band's expansion in style, towards a more post-hardcore sound.

Dave Grohl played drums on the album. He took a lead vocal on one track and helped to write others.

Critical reception
Newsday  praised Grohl's drumming on the album, writing that it "has that baseball-bats-against-tree-trunks quality that [he] would make so distinctive in Nirvana."

Track listing

All songs written by Scream.

"Caffeine Dream" - 3:14
"Sunmaker" - 4:48
"Mardi Gras" - 3:51
"Land Torn Down" - 3:59
"Gods Look Down" - 4:18
"Crackman" - 5:43
"Gas" - 4:37
"Dying Days" - 5:22
"Poppa Says" - 4:12
"Rain" - 4:37

("Crackman" does not appear on the CD version.)

Personnel
Scream
Peter Stahl - lead vocals, mixing
Franz Stahl - guitars, vocals, mixing
Skeeter Thompson - bass, vocals
Dave Grohl - drums, lead vocals on "Gods Look Down"
Eli Janney - producer, mixing
Tomas Squip - photography

References

Scream (band) albums
1993 albums